Peter Morris (born 30 November 1961) is a British swimmer. He competed in the men's 200 metre butterfly at the 1980 Summer Olympics.

References

External links
 

1961 births
Living people
British male swimmers
Olympic swimmers of Great Britain
Swimmers at the 1980 Summer Olympics
Place of birth missing (living people)
Male butterfly swimmers